Jozef Kabaň (born 4 January 1973) is a Slovak automobile designer. He started his career as a designer at Volkswagen. In 2003 he moved to Audi as an exterior design assistant. In 2007 he advanced to the position of Chief of Exterior Design at Audi. He was exterior designer of the Volkswagen Lupo, SEAT Arosa, Bugatti Veyron and Škoda Octavia. He has been Chief of Exterior Design at Škoda Auto since 2008. In early 2017 he left Škoda for BMW to become its head of design replacing Karim Habib. In 2019 he changed position within BMW Group and headed design at its subsidiary Rolls-Royce Motor Cars. After half a year he decided to leave Rolls-Royce and BMW Group returning to VW in January 2020, this time for its main VW brand.

Education 
Kaban completed a degree in Industrial Design from the Academy of Fine Arts and Design located in Bratislava, Slovakia in 1991. He graduated with a Master of Arts from the Royal College of Art, London, UK in 1997.

References

External links
Auto CZ 
Who's Where: Jozef Kaban appointed Head of Škoda Auto Design

1973 births
Living people
People from Námestovo
Slovak engineers
Slovak automobile designers
Škoda people
BMW designers